Gadougou I is a rural commune in the Cercle of Kita in the Kayes Region of south-western Mali. The commune includes 17 villages and in the 2009 census had a population of 25,775. The principal village is Sagabari.

References

External links
.

Communes of Kayes Region